Gordon Walter Semenoff (born July 11, 1953), is a theoretical physicist and professor of physics at the University of British Columbia, Canada. He is known for his research on quantum mechanics, quantum field theory, statistical mechanics and string theory and is particularly famous for his co-invention, together with Antti Niemi, of the parity anomaly in odd-dimensional gauge field theories and for his pioneering work on graphene. He is also well known for development of thermal field theory, the application of index theorems and their generalizations in quantum field theory and string theory, notably with respect to the duality between string theories and gauge field theories.

Education and career
Gordon Semenoff was born on July 11, 1953 in Pincher Creek, Alberta, Canada, where he attended Matthew Halton High School, graduating in the Class of 1971.  After completing Bachelor of Science (1976) and Doctor of Philosophy (1981) degrees at the University of Alberta in Edmonton, Gordon spent one year, 1981–1982, as a postdoctoral fellow at the University of Alberta and the subsequent year, 1982–1983, as a postdoctoral fellow at the Center for Theoretical Physics of the Massachusetts Institute of Technology (MIT).  In 1983 he was appointed a university research fellow at the University of British Columbia and has spent the remainder of his career to date at that institution, being promoted to full professor in 1990. He has held a number of prestigious visiting appointments, including membership at the Institute for Advanced Study in Princeton, New Jersey, in 1984, 1985 and 2000, and visiting professorships at Eidgenössische Technische Hochschule (ETH) in Zurich, Switzerland, in 1986, Hokkaido University in Hokkaido, Japan, in 1989, the Niels Bohr Institute in Copenhagen, Denmark, in 1989, 1999 and 2012, Uppsala University in Uppsala, Sweden, in 2000, the Institut Henri Poincaré in Paris, France, in 2001 and 2011, the Institut des Hautes Études Scientifiques (IHES) in Bures sur Yvette, France, in 2005, 2006 and 2020, the Isaac Newton Institute in Cambridge, U.K. in 2007 and 2012 and the University of Tours in Tours, France, in 2008.

Awards
 Jacob Biely Research Prize, University of British Columbia, 2013
 Officer of the Order of Canada, 2012
 Queen Elizabeth II Diamond Jubilee Medal, 2012
 Lifetime Achievement Award of the Canadian Association of Physicists, 2012
 Doctor of Science, honoris causa, University of Lethbridge, Canada, 2011
 Brockhouse Medal for Achievement in Condensed Matter and Material Physics (Canadian Association of Physicists) 2010
 Majorana Prize  2006
 CAP-CRM Prize in Theoretical and Mathematical Physics, 2000
 Elected as a Fellow of the Royal Society of Canada in 2000
 Macdowell Medal of the University of British Columbia in 1990
 Japan Society for the Promotion of Science Fellowship, 1989
 Killam Research Prize, University of British Columbia, 1989
 NSERC University Research Fellowship, 1983
 NSERC Postdoctoral Fellowship, 1982
 Alberta Graduate Fellowship 1980–1981
 NSERC Postgraduate Fellowship 1976–1980

References

External links 
  Publications from Inspire
  Web page at the University of British Columbia
   Citation for the Order of Canada   pic   pic
 Citation for Lifetime Achievement Award 
  Citation for Brockhouse Medal 
   Citation for CAP/CRM prize
 Honorary Doctor of Science 
  Perimeter Institute Affiliation
  Invited lectures and conference presentations
  Colloquium poster  Colloquium poster  Public Lecture  Public Lecture
 / A Nobel Connection
 More graphene
 Prairie Post interview 
 Pincher Creek Echo interview

Canadian string theorists
Academic staff of the University of British Columbia
Officers of the Order of Canada
Living people
1953 births
Fellows of the Royal Society of Canada
MIT Center for Theoretical Physics alumni